DRV may refer to:

 Deutscher Radfahrer-Verband, the cycling unit of the Nazi Sports Office (NSRL)
 Deutscher Rugby-Verband, (German Rugby Federation)
 Democratic Republic of Vietnam, i.e. North Vietnam, a socialist country that existed from 1945 to 1976. After the Vietnam War, it reunited with South Vietnam on 2 July 1976, creating the Socialist Republic of Vietnam of today.
 Dietary Reference Values, the UK's Department of Health's nutritional intake recommendations
 Darunavir, an antiretroviral drug (treatment of HIV), which inhibits the viral protease